Liston Range Front Lighthouse is a lighthouse in Delaware, United States, on the Delaware River. It is a range light, paired with the Liston Range Rear Light, to create the Liston Range.

History
Liston Range Front Lighthouse was built in 1906. It was a 3-story wood keeper's house with a square wood cupola on top and had a second order Fresnel lens.

It was added to the National Register of Historic Places in 2004.

References

Lighthouses completed in 1906
Lighthouses on the National Register of Historic Places in Delaware
Lighthouses in New Castle County, Delaware
National Register of Historic Places in New Castle County, Delaware
1906 establishments in Delaware